The Astra 1916 bomber was a large 3-engined biplane, with two fuselages and a central nacelle. Power was supplied by three  Renault 12Eb water-cooled V-12 piston engines, two tractor engines in the noses of the fuselages and a pusher engine at the rear of the central nacelle. The flight crew of two sat in individual cockpits in the central nacelle and a gunner were housed in a cockpit, aft of the wings, in each fuselage. Designed for a 1916 concours puissant the performance of the aircraft was unsatisfactory and further development was abandoned.

Specifications

References

Military aircraft of World War I
Biplanes
Aircraft manufactured in France
Aircraft first flown in 1916